Coniston Cold is a village and civil parish in the Craven district of North Yorkshire, England.

According to the 2001 UK census, Coniston Cold parish had a population of 186, increasing to 203 at the 2011 Census.

References

External links

 Wedding Films created at the nearby Coniston Hotel

Villages in North Yorkshire
Civil parishes in North Yorkshire